"Walking in the Rain" is a song written by Barry Mann, Phil Spector, and Cynthia Weil. It was originally recorded by the girl group the Ronettes in 1964 who had a charting hit with their version. Jay and the Americans released a charting hit cover of the song in 1969. The song has since been recorded by many other artists over the years, including the Walker Brothers.

The Ronettes version
The Ronettes were the first to release "Walking in the Rain". Their single reached number 23 on the Billboard Hot 100 chart in 1964.  The song also reached number three on the R&B Singles Chart in 1965.  The single contains sound effects of thunder and lightning, which earned audio engineer Larry Levine a Grammy nomination. Phil Spector produced the record.

In 2004, the Ronettes' version was ranked at No. 266 on Rolling Stone's 500 Greatest Songs of All Time, while being moved down to No. 269 in the 2010 update. The song didn't get into the 2021 list.

Jay and the Americans version

The pop group Jay and the Americans released a cover of "Walkin' in the Rain" in 1969 on their album Wax Museum, Vol. 1. Their version of the song reached number 19 on the U.S. Billboard Hot 100 and peaked at number 14 on Cash Box. It also hit number 8 on the Adult Contemporary chart, it was the last top-40 hit for the group.

Chart history
The Ronettes

The Walker Brothers

Jay & the Americans

The Partridge Family starring David Cassidy

Cheetah

Other versions
1967 – The Walker Brothers, single backed with the original b-side "Baby Make It Last the Time". This version alters the gender of the lyrics for a heterosexual male perspective. It reached number 26 in the UK Singles Chart. It was the group's final UK single before their first split.
1973 - featured on the television show The Partridge Family, single released in Canada, England, and other parts of Europe backed with "Together We're Better"; also with gender-altered lyrics, reached number 10 on the UK Singles Chart.
1978 - non-album single by the female-led Australian rock group Cheetah, reaching number 10 on the Australian Singles Chart.
1990 - The Party (from the Mickey Mouse Club) covered this song on their debut album. Dee Dee Magno sang lead vocals.
2003 – the English electropop duo Erasure included a cover version of "Walking in the Rain" on their tenth studio album Other People's Songs. Singer Andy Bell, an out gay man, does not alter the original lyrics sung by the Ronettes.

References

External links
 
 

Songs about weather
1964 singles
1964 songs
1967 singles
1970 singles
The Ronettes songs
Jay and the Americans songs
The Walker Brothers songs
The Partridge Family songs
Songs written by Barry Mann
Songs written by Phil Spector
Song recordings produced by Phil Spector
Song recordings with Wall of Sound arrangements
Songs with lyrics by Cynthia Weil
United Artists Records singles
Philles Records singles